Avelino Chaves Couto (26 January 1931 – 10 January 2021) was a Spanish professional footballer who played as a forward.

Career
Born in Verín, Chaves played for Valladolid, Granada and Zaragoza. He was the top scorer in the Segunda División during the 1954–55 season. He retired from playing in 1958, having suffered a knee injury in 1956.

He worked at Zaragoza after retiring from playing, working as their 'sporting director' until 1996, spending a total of 44 years with the club.

References

1931 births
2021 deaths
Spanish footballers
Real Valladolid players
Granada CF footballers
Real Zaragoza players
La Liga players
Segunda División players
Association football forwards
Real Zaragoza non-playing staff